The OGOGO is an Avant-garde jazz ensemble that formed in Los Angeles in the early 1990s. The group continues to perform and record as of 2009.

Members

Members of what was to become the OGOGO performed together under various band names in the early 1990s, releasing their first album, Live In Your Bedroom, as the OGOGO in 1998 on Innova Recordings. The OGOGO on that album included trombonist Rodney Oakes and guitarist Igor Grigoriev. Igor leads  OGOGO, an ensemble with an ever-changing lineup. Since 1998 they made a number of recordings for III Records sometimes extending their lineup to Extra Large Ensemble (known as XLOGOGO).

Members of the group are all involved in different projects outside of OGOGO. That freedom contributes to their wide sound landscape and insures incorporation of ever changing musical influences from other styles.

Albums

A significant part of the OGOGO sound is use of "funny instruments" (closely related to prepared piano of John Cage) in addition to the traditional jazz lineup of guitars, saxophones, trumpets, trombones, bass and drums, as well as the theatrical outfits and invited guest artists while performing. All these aspects make the OGOGO's performances a unique experience.
In 2000 the OGOGO recorded album with Ira Schulman, Ira & Igor. Schulman’s woodwind instruments, backed by the sheer drive of Igor’s guitars, contributed to the fact that Three Dances In Colour became an underground cult standard.

In 2007 OGOGO released highly acclaimed album Solo View. Music that spans influences ranging from Johann Sebastian Bach to Karlheinz Stockhausen. "Masterfully structured, masterfully arranged and masterfully performed." - Fred M. Wheeler, Tokafi, Germany. "A very different and wild sound pallette, a very unique experience." - Don Campau, KKUP, San Francisco

OGOGO-Linden album, released in 2008, is the result of collaboration of OGOGO and Avant-Garde artist Ron Linden. All compositions are based on Linden's paintings.

On February 13 of 2009 OGOGO's newest release, Redux, a duo of two wonderful musicians, Igor Grigoriev (guitar) and Rodney Oakes (MIDI trombone), became available on III Records.

Lunar Surfaphase is OGOGO's newest release of 2009 and this CD is the solo magic work of Igor Grigoriev.

External links
https://web.archive.org/web/20080620103204/http://igorogogo.com/index.htm
http://www.myspace.com/ogogoigor
http://www.iiirecords.com/ogogo.htm
http://www.iiirecords.com/ogogo_live.htm
http://www.iiirecords.com/ira&igor.htm
http://www.iiirecords.com/igOr_OGOGO-Solo_View_CD.htm
http://www.iiirecords.com/OGOGO-Linden.htm
http://www.iiirecords.com/OGOGO%20-%20Redux%20album.htm

American experimental musical groups
American jazz ensembles from California